Fernand-Marie-Eugène Le Gout-Gérard was born in Saint-Lô in 1856 and died on 4 August 1924. He was a French painter mainly of seascapes.

Biography 
Taught at the Saint-Lô college he became a tax collector. In around 1890 he discovered Concarneau and at the age of 33 abandoned his career and took up painting.  Subsequently he became a member of the "Société nationale des Beaux-Arts'"  and the London '"Pastel Society". In 1903 he moved to Concarneau and became known as a marine painter particularly of the ports and markets of Brittany.  He was painter, watercolourist and designer. His house, the villa Ty Ker Moor, became a meeting place of the artists known as the "Groupe de Concarneau". He painted market scenes, fairs, and the returning fishing vessels; scenes of everyday Breton life.

Some of his paintings

In 1899 Legout-Gérard exhibited the painting "Derrière la ville close (Concarneau, temps gris)" to the Paris salon (La Société nationale des Beaux-Arts on the Champ-de-Mars). This painting was purchased by the state  and in 1901 his painting "L'entrée du Vieux bassin" was also purchased by the state when shown at that year's salon.

Other paintings by  Legout-Gérard include "Le marché à Concarneau",  "Le quai Pénéroff",  "Thoniers  dans la baie du soir", "Etretat",  "Thoniers, soleil couchant" and  "Le marché à Quingamp". Gout-Gérard involved himself closely  in the affairs of Concarneau. He was the president of the "Comité de la fête des Filets bleus" an organization which strove to improve the lot of the local fisherman and took an active interest in preserving Concarneau's ramparts. 
Apart from his Brittany paintings he painted in Normandy, Venice, Greece, and North Africa. An exhibition of his work was staged in 2010 at the Musée du Faouët.

References

People from Saint-Lô
1856 births
1924 deaths
19th-century French painters
French male painters
20th-century French painters
20th-century French male artists
19th-century French male artists